is the first studio album by Japanese rock band Asian Kung-Fu Generation and their second major-label release overall, released on November 19, 2003 on Kioon Music. The album's name is sometimes given as "Kunkei Five M," but the reading "Kimitsunagi" is given in katakana on the original compact disc. Peaking at number five on the Oricon charts, the LP retained two successful singles, "Mirai no Kakera" and "Kimi to Iu Hana, and has gone on to sell over 250,000 copies.
The album is also featured in a live studio recording which is included as a bonus DVD from the limited edition of future compilation, Best Hit AKG.

Track listing

B-sides

Personnel
Masafumi Gotō – lead vocals, guitar, lyrics
Kensuke Kita – lead guitar, background vocals
Takahiro Yamada –  bass, background vocals
Kiyoshi Ijichi – drums
Asian Kung-Fu Generation – producer
Tohru Takayama – mixing
Mitsuharu Harada – mastering
Kenichi Nakamura – recording
Yusuke Nakamura – art direction

Chart positions

Album

Singles

References

External links
 CDJapan
 Kimi Tsunagi Five M at MusicBrainz
 Kimi Tsunagi Five M at Last.fm

2003 debut albums
Asian Kung-Fu Generation albums
Japanese-language albums
Ki/oon Records albums